Marek Adamowicz, also known as Oreł, is a former guitar player of Polish street punk band The Analogs.

He had been playing for The Analogs from 1995 to 1996. Formerly he had been playing in ska band Dr. Cycos together with other The Analogs members: Ziemowit Pawluk and Paweł Czekała. After leaving The Analogs Marek started career as a DJ (Electric Rudeboyz).

References
 The Analogs history at the official website
 The Analogs official forum
 Jimmy Jazz Records

Polish DJs
Polish guitarists
Polish male guitarists
The Analogs members
Year of birth missing (living people)
Living people